The 1945 Iowa State Cyclones football team represented Iowa State College of Agricultural and Mechanic Arts (later renamed Iowa State University) in the Big Six Conference during the 1945 college football season. In their fourth year under head coach Mike Michalske, the Cyclones compiled a 4–3–1 record (2–2–1 against conference opponents), finished in third place in the conference, and outscored their opponents by a combined total of 156 to 97. They played their home games at Clyde Williams Field in Ames, Iowa.

There was no team captain selected for the 1945 season. Four Iowa State players were selected as a first-team all-conference players: guard Jack Fathauer, backs Dick Howard and Gene Phelps, and center Jim Riding.

Schedule

References

Iowa State
Iowa State Cyclones football seasons
Iowa State Cyclones football